Operation: Get Down is the second solo studio album by American rapper Craig Mack. It was released in June 1997 through Street Life Records. Recording sessions took place at Santa Monica Sound Recorders in California. Production was handled by Al West, Demarie "Meech" Sheki, Prince Markie Dee, Johnny "J", Ty Fyffe, and Eric B., who also served as executive producer. It features contributions from Demarie Sheki, PJ DeMarks, La Shawn Monet and Natasha Barr. The album peaked at number 46 on the Billboard 200 and number 17 on the Top R&B/Hip-Hop Albums chart in the United States. Its lead single "What I Need" was a minor success reaching #103 on the Billboard Hot 100 and #55 on the Hot R&B/Hip-Hop Songs.

Track listing

Notes
 signifies an original producer.

Sample credits
Track 4 contains an interpolation of "Love Hangover" written by Marilyn McLeod and Pamela Sawyer.
Track 5 contains a sample from "Inmate Connection" written by Norman Durham and Woody Cunningham as recorded by Kleeer, and also contains an interpolation of "It Never Rains (In Southern California)" written by Raphael Saadiq and Timothy Christian Riley.
Track 8 contains a sample from "Games People Play" written by Kurtis Blow, David Reeves, Sal Abbatiello and William Waring as recorded by Sweet G.
Track 10 contains a sample from "Spoonin' Rap" written by Gabriel Jackson as recorded by Spoonie Gee.

Chart history

References

External links
Operation: Get Down on Bandcamp

1997 albums
Craig Mack albums
Albums produced by Eric B.
Albums produced by Ty Fyffe
Albums produced by Johnny "J"
Scotti Brothers Records albums